Luke Cain (born 3 February 1980) is an SH2-classified Australian shooter who became a paraplegic after an accident while playing Australian rules football. He started competing in 2007, as the sport suited his disability, and has been a Victorian Institute of Sport scholarship holder since 2008. He first represented Australia internationally in 2009 at a World Cup event in South Korea. He has also represented Australia in two Paralympic Games including the 2016 Rio Paralympics.

Personal
Cain was born on 3 February 1980 in Rosebud, Victoria. He started playing Australian rules football when he was seven years old for the Rye Football Club.  He played senior football for Rosebud Football Club as a full-forward. In August 1999, at the age of nineteen, he was playing for Rosebud in a game against Hastings Football Club when he broke his neck after being sandwiched between a teammate and an opposing player. He is a paraplegic, and requires use of a wheelchair because of paralysis that affects him from the chest down.  He has limited use of his fingers and no use of his hands. Before his accident, he participated in a range of sports, including basketball, athletics, waterskiing, kneeboarding and wakeboarding. After his accident, he continued in some sports, including angling.  , he resides in Boneo, Victoria.

His cousin is Travis Cloke, an AFL All-Australian full-forward. Cain has been an inspiration to his cousin on the football field. At the same time, Cloke has supported Cain. Other cousins include AFL players Jason Cloke and Cameron Cloke.

Shooting

Cain is an SH2-classified shooter competing in 10m air rifle prone and 10m air rifle standing events. He has been a Victorian Institute of Sport scholarship holder since 2008, and is a member of the Springvale Range Club. He is coached by Miro Sipek as an individual and when on the national team.

As a youngster, Cain hunted with his father and cousin. He took up the sport of shooting because it was one of the few available to people with his physical limitations.  , he was sponsored by Miall's Gun Shop of Frankston, Victoria, who provided him with competition gear including cleaning supplies, a rifle case and a rifle.  He holds two world records, one in the individual 600–600 R4 prone event, and another in the R4 10-metre standing event.

Cain started competing in 2007, and made the Australian national team the same year. During Australia's 2009 domestic series, the Australia Cup, an invitation-only series for the top shooters in the country, he earned a bronze, silver and gold medal. That year, he made his national team debut at an international event when he represented Australia at the 2009 ISSF World Cup in South Korea. By early 2010, he was looking for a sponsor to assist with costs for his international competitions. He set a personal best of 598 out of 600 in the SH-2 prone air event at the 2010 World Cup in Germany, and not long after, set a new personal best when he shot 599 at the same event at the 2010 World Cup in France. He came in first at the 2010 Oceania Shooting Federation Continental Championship. At the 2010 IPC Shooting World Championships in Zagreb, he came in first in the SH-2 prone air event by setting a world record of 600 points, a perfect score. At the 2011 Great Britain International, he finished second in the 10m air rifle prone event. He competed in the United States-hosted International Paralympic Committee World Cup in 2011, finishing fourth in the R5 Air Rifle Prone event with a score of 599. He earned a gold medal in the team event with teammates Jason Maroney and Bradley Mark. In 2012, he trained up to six days a week. At the Australian nationals, he finished second in the prone event behind New Zealander Michael Johnson, and third in the standing event behind fellow Australian Bradley Marks and Johnson.

Cain was selected to represent Australia at the 2012 Summer Paralympics in Mixed R5-10m Air Rifle Prone-SH2 and Mixed R4-10m Air Rifle Standing-SH2 shooting events. Competing on 3 September, he did not medal, finishing 27th in the standing event and 28th in the prone event.

Most recently Cain had represented Australia in the 2016 Rio Paralympics. He competed in the Mixed 10 m air rifle standing SH2 and the Mixed 10 m air rifle prone SH2. Cain did not medal, placing 26th in the standing event and 33rd in the prone event.

Performance

References

External links

 
 
 
 

Living people
1980 births
Paralympic shooters of Australia
People with paraplegia
Shooters at the 2012 Summer Paralympics
Shooters at the 2016 Summer Paralympics
Wheelchair category Paralympic competitors
Victorian Institute of Sport alumni